Patricia Storace is an American poet.

She is the 1993 winner of the Witter Bynner Poetry Prize by the American Academy of Arts and Letters and a 1996 recipient of a Whiting Award.

Life
She was raised in Mobile, Alabama, and graduated from Barnard College, and University of Cambridge.  She lives in New York City.

Her work has appeared in the AGNI, Harper's, New York Review of Books, Los Angeles Times, The Paris Review, Ploughshares, and the Arvon anthology edited by Ted Hughes and Seamus Heaney.

Works

Poetry

Novel

Memoir

Children's

References

External links
 
Profile at The Whiting Foundation

Year of birth missing (living people)
Living people
American memoirists
Writers from Mobile, Alabama
Barnard College alumni
Alumni of the University of Cambridge
Poets from Alabama
American women poets
American women memoirists
21st-century American women